Aqris was an Estonian software development company located in Tallinn, founded in 1999 by Oliver Wihler and Sander Mägi.

The company was known in the Java developer community for its product RefactorIT, an open source refactor plugin for Java IDEs (Eclipse, Sun ONE Studio, Borland Software's JBuilder, Oracle's JDeveloper, NetBeans and Emacs).

References

External links
 

Defunct companies of Estonia
Estonian companies established in 1999
Software companies established in 1999